Norman Maxwell Raines (22 September 1920 – 5 August 1987) was an Australian rules footballer who played with St Kilda in the Victorian Football League (VFL).

Notes

External links 

1920 births
1987 deaths
Australian rules footballers from Victoria (Australia)
St Kilda Football Club players
Sandhurst Football Club players